Ciencia Puerto Rico (or CienciaPR) is US-based non-profit organization that advocates for science in Puerto Rico and supports Puerto Rican researchers. Their online community of more than 14,000 researchers, educators, students, and allies work to show that science can empower people to improve their lives and society. They provide resources in both English and Spanish.

Leadership 
Ciencia Puerto Rico was founded by Daniel Colón Ramos in 2006. Giovanna Guerrero-Medina is the executive director, Mónica Feliú-Mójer is the director of communication and science outreach and Greetchen Díaz-Muñoz is the director of science education and community partnerships.

Impact and Collaborations 
As of 2015, CienciaPR was the most popular science and science jobs website in Puerto Rico. That year, CienciaPR was recognized as a Bright Spot in Hispanic Education by the White House Initiative on Educational Excellence for Hispanics. In 2018, CienciaPR was named Science Defender by the Union of Concerned Scientists.

Although CienciaPR was planning a project to radically improve STEM education in Puerto Rico, the 2017 Atlantic hurricane season slowed down their progress and changed their focus. They now provide  disaster-related STEM lessons in addition to their other resources. These lessons involve project-based learning.

CienciaPR was used as a model for a diversity initiative at Yale University, called the Yale Ciencia Initiative. The two programs received a joint grant from the US National Science Foundation to study the impact of the disaster-related STEM lessons in Puerto Rico after Hurricane Irma and Hurricane Maria.

CienciaPR has also worked with the AAAS Caribbean Division on a conference and on advocacy related to Puerto Rican science policy.

Published works 

 González Espada, Wilson J.; Colón Ramos, Daniel A.; Feliú Mójer, Mónica I., eds. (2011). ¡Ciencia Boricua!: Ensayos y anécdotas del científico puertorro [Boricua Science!: Essays and Anecdotes of the Puerto Rican Scientist]. San Juan, Puerto Rico: Editorial Callejón. p. 246. .

References 

Scientific societies based in the United States
Hispanic and Latino organizations
Puerto Rican scientists